The Bengali letter  is derived from the Siddhaṃ , and is marked by the lack of a horizontal head line, unlike its Devanagari counterpart, . The inherent vowel of Bengali consonant letters is /ɔ/, so the bare letter  will sometimes be transliterated as "kho" instead of "kha". Adding okar, the "o" vowel mark, gives a reading of /kho/.

Like all Indic consonants,  can be modified by marks to indicate another (or no) vowel than its inherent "a".

in Bengali-using languages

 is used as a basic consonant character in all of the major Bengali script orthographies, including Bengali and Assamese.

Conjuncts with 

  +  [kh+ba] gives us the ligature

  +  [kh+ya] gives us the ligature

  +  [kh+ra] gives us the ligature

 while  +  [r+kha] gives us the ligature

See also
 Kha (Indic)

References

Bengali letters